Irwon Station is a station on Seoul Subway Line 3. It is in Irwon-dong, Gangnam-gu, Seoul.

It is the closest subway station to the Samsung Medical Center, and a free shuttle runs between the two. The shuttle bus can be accessed via Exit #1. There is also elevator access.

Station layout

References 

Metro stations in Gangnam District
Seoul Metropolitan Subway stations
Railway stations opened in 1993
Seoul Subway Line 3